National Route 335 is a national highway of Japan connecting Rausu, Hokkaidō and Shibetsu, Hokkaidō in Japan, with a total length of 42.4 km (26.35 mi).

References

National highways in Japan
Roads in Hokkaido